Elizabethtown (hamlet), New York may refer to:

 Elizabethtown (CDP), New York, in Essex County
 Elizabethtown, Herkimer County, New York